Lake Tauca is a former lake in the Altiplano of Bolivia. It is also known as Lake Pocoyu for its constituent lakes: Lake Poopó, Salar de Coipasa and Salar de Uyuni. The lake covered large parts of the southern Altiplano between the Eastern Cordillera and the Western Cordillera, covering an estimated  of the basins of present-day Lake Poopó and the Salars of Uyuni, Coipasa and adjacent basins. Water levels varied, possibly reaching  in altitude. The lake was saline. The lake received water from Lake Titicaca, but whether this contributed most of Tauca's water or only a small amount is controversial; the quantity was sufficient to influence the local climate and depress the underlying terrain with its weight. Diatoms, plants and animals developed in the lake, sometimes forming reef knolls.

The duration of Lake Tauca's existence is uncertain. Research in 2011 indicated that the rise in lake levels began 18,500 BP, peaking 16,000 and 14,500 years ago. About 14,200 years ago, lake levels dropped before rising again until 11,500 years ago. Some researchers postulate that the last phase of Lake Tauca may have continued until 8,500 BP. The drying of the lake, which may have occurred because of the Bølling-Allerød climate oscillation, left the salt deposits of Salar de Uyuni.

Lake Tauca is one of several ancient lakes which formed in the Altiplano. Other known lakes are Lake Escara, Ouki, Salinas, Lake Minchin, Inca Huasi and Sajsi, in addition to several water-level rises of Lake Titicaca. The identity of these lakes is controversial; Sajsi is often considered part of Lake Tauca, and the lake is frequently divided into an earlier (Ticaña) and a later (Coipasa) phase.

The formation of Lake Tauca depended on a reduction in air temperature over the Altiplano and an increase in precipitation, which may have been caused by shifts in the Intertropical Convergence Zone (ITCZ) and increased easterly winds. It was originally supposed that glacial melting might have filled Lake Tauca, but the quantity of water would not have been sufficient to fill the whole lake. The lake was accompanied by glacial advance, noticeable at Cerro Azanaques and Tunupa. Elsewhere in South America, water levels and glaciers also expanded during the Lake Tauca phase.

Description

Overview 
The highland is in the Andes, the world's longest mountain chain which was formed during the Tertiary with a primary phase of uplift in the Miocene. The Eastern Cordillera creates a rain shadow over the Altiplano. The climate of the Altiplano is usually dry when westerly winds prevail; during the austral summer, heating induces easterly winds which transport humidity from the Amazon. Although precipitation decreases from north to south, the evaporation rate throughout the Altiplano exceeds . Most precipitation is recorded between October and April. Occasionally during winter (but also in summer), frontal disturbances result in snowfall. Strong winds and high insolation are other aspects of the Altiplano climate. Much of the water balance in the present-day Altiplano-Atacama area is maintained by groundwater flow. The terrain of the Altiplano consists primarily of sediments deposited by lakes and rivers during the Miocene and Pleistocene. A Paleozoic basement underlies Cretaceous and Tertiary sediments. The Andean Central Volcanic Zone and the Altiplano–Puna volcanic complex are in the Cordillera Occidental.

Lake Tauca was one of many lakes which formed around the world during glacial epochs; others include the Baltic Ice Lake in Europe and Lake Bonneville in North America. Lake Titicaca and the southern salt flats are two separate water basins, connected by the Rio Desaguadero when Titicaca is high enough. The theory that the Altiplano was formerly covered by lakes was first proposed by J. Minchin in 1882. The formation of such lakes usually, but not always, coincided with lower temperatures.

Geography 

According to 1978 reconstructions, the lake would have consisted of three basins (Poopó, Coipasa and Uyuni) linked by narrow straits. Around 14,100 BP, Tauca covered the southern Altiplano. Several different estimates for its surface area exist:

Lake Tauca was the largest paleolake in the Altiplano in the last 120,000 years at least, and comparable to present-day Lake Michigan. Its predecessors are known as Lake Minchin and Lake Escara. Other lake cycles are known as Ouki (120,000–98,000 years ago), Salinas (95,000–80,000 years ago), Inca Huasi (about 46,000 years ago), Sajsi (24,000–20,500 years ago) and Coipasa (13,000–11,000 years ago). Inca Huasi and Minchin are sometimes considered the same lake phase, and other researchers have suggested that Lake Minchin is a combination of several phases. The Ouki cycle may be subdivided in the future, and a number of sometimes-contradictory names and dates exist for these paleolakes.

Water depths reached . Some disagreement about water levels at various sites may reflect differing isostatic rebound of the land covered by the lake. Of the previous lake cycles in the area, only the Ouki cycle appears to have exceeded that altitude.

Transitions between lake cycles occurred in about one thousand years.

Lake Tauca was the largest lake on the Altiplano in the last 130,000, 120,000 or 100,000 years. Although the preceding paleolake (Minchin) was probably shallower, there is disagreement about the methods used to ascertain water depth. Confusion may have resulted from the incorrect attribution of Tauca's shorelines to Lake Minchin; a shoreline at  formerly attributed to Lake Minchin was dated to the Tauca phase at 13,790 BP. The theory that Tauca is the largest lake follows a deepening trend in the southern Altiplano paleolakes which contrasts with a decreasing trend in the level of Lake Titicaca during the Pleistocene. This pattern probably occurred because the threshold between the two basins progressively eroded, allowing water from Titicaca to flow into the southern Altiplano. The lakes left erosional benches, fan deltas (where the lakes interacted with ice) and lake-sediment deposits, and eroded into moraines. 

The lake and its predecessors (such as Lake Minchin) formed in the area currently occupied by salt flats such as the Salar de Uyuni, Salar de Coipasa, Lake Poopó, Salar de Empexa, Salar de Laguani, and Salar de Carcote—several tens of meters beneath the Tauca water level. The present-day cities of Oruro and Uyuni are located in areas flooded by Lake Tauca. Salar de Ascotán may or may not have been part of Lake Tauca. The submergence of a large part of the Altiplano under Lake Tauca reduced the production of dust there and its supply to Patagonia, but "restocked" the sediments and thus increased dust supply once Lake Tauca dried up. The terrain above  was affected by glaciation. In the Coipasa basin, a major debris avalanche from the Tata Sabaya volcano rolled over terraces left by Lake Tauca.

Hydrology 

Such volumes could have been reached in centuries. Tauca may have been subject to geothermal heating.

The lake was deep and saline. The salt content seems to have consisted of NaCl and Na2SO4. Estimated salt concentrations:

Some of this salt penetrated aquifers beneath the lake, which still exist. A significant excess NaCl concentration has been inferred for Lake Tauca, possibly stemming from salt domes whose contents moved from lake to lake.

Glacial meltwater may have contributed substantially to Lake Tauca's development. Strontium isotope data indicates that water draining from Lake Titicaca through the Rio Desaguadero may have contributed between 70% and 83% of Lake Tauca's water, an increase of between 8 and 30 times the current outflow of Lake Titicaca via the Desaguadero. A drop in the level of Lake Titicaca about 11,500 BP may have resulted in its outflow drying up, favouring the disappearance of Lake Tauca. According to other research, the increased outflow of Lake Titicaca would have had to be unrealistically large to supply Lake Tauca with water if Titicaca was its principal source. Other estimates assume that one-third of Tauca's water came from Lake Titicaca, no more than 15% for any lake cycle, or the much-lower four percent (similar to today's five-percent contribution from Titicaca to Lake Poopó). During the Coipasa cycle, Lake Poopó may have contributed about 13% of the water. About 53% of Lake Tauca's water came from the Eastern Cordillera. About 60,000 years ago, the Desaguadero probably began transporting water from Lake Titicaca to the Uyuni area and the southern paleolakes. Tauca was fed by the Río Grande de Lipez on the south, the Río Lauca on the northwest and the glaciers of the two cordilleras on the east and west.

Although earlier theories postulated that large lakes formed from glacial meltwater, increased precipitation or decreased evaporation (or both) are today considered necessary for lake formation; a complete glacial melting would have had to occur in less than about a century to produce the required volume. The water volume would be insufficient to explain Lake Tauca's high water levels; however, some smaller lakes in the southern Altiplano probably expanded from glacial meltwater alone. The lake may have contributed to increased precipitation by influencing land breezes. According to strontium isotope data, there may have been little water exchange between Tauca's Uyuni and Coipasa basins. During the Coipasa lake cycle, the Coipasa-Uyuni and Poopó basins had a limited connection. Minor water-level fluctuations occurred during the lake's existence.

Based on a  surface area, the evaporation rate has been estimated at over —comparable to the discharges of the Nile or Rhine. Less than half of this evaporation returned to the lake as precipitation; in the central sector of the lake at Tunupa, this would have increased precipitation by 80%, delaying the retreat of glaciers in the area. Groundwater from Lake Tauca may have drained into the Quebrada Puripica, northeast of Laguna Miscanti. Given the height of the sill between the two basins and evidence found at Poopó, water may have drained from the Coipasa-Uyuni basin into Lake Poopó during the Coipasa cycle.

Glacial debris and ice were probably present at the lake, with fan deltas at Tunupa overlapping the Lake Tauca shore. At Tunupa and Cerro Azanaques, glaciers reached their maximum size shortly before the lake level peaked and probably contributed to water levels when their retreat began. Two minor glacial advances, over 12,000 BP and about 11,000 BP, appear to coincide with Lake Tauca.

The continental environment Pleistocene sediments were formed from lacustrine carbonate deposits. These rocks contain amphibole, clay minerals such as illite, kaolinite and smectite, feldspar, plagioclase, potassium feldspar, pyroxene and quartz. The composition of these rocks resembles that of the Altiplano soils.

Biology 

Low concentrations of pollen are found in sediments left by Lake Tauca in the Salar de Uyuni. Lake Minchin sediments contain more pollen (indicating that it may have had a more favourable climate), but the lack of pollen may be the product of a deeper lake. Polylepis may have thrived in favourable salinity and climatic conditions. Increased Polylepis and Acaena pollen is observed towards the end of the Tauca episode.

The lake was deep enough for the development of planktonic diatoms, including the dominant Cyclotella choctawatcheeana. Other diatoms noted in Lake Tauca are the benthic Denticula subtilis, the epiphytic Achnanthes brevipes, Cocconeis placentula and Rhopalodia gibberula, the planktonic Cyclotella striata and the tychoplanktonic Fragilaria atomus, Fragilaria construens and Fragilaria pinnata. Epithemia has also been found.

Sediments at the shoreline contain fossils of gastropods and ostracods; Littoridina and Succineidae snails have been used to date the lake. Other genera included Myriophyllum, Isoetes (indicating the formation of littoral communities) and Pediastrum. Algae grew in the lake, leading to reef knolls (bioherms) formed by carbonate rocks. These grew in several phases, and some were initially considered stromatolites. They developed around objects jutting from the surface, such as rocks. Tube- and tuft-shaped structures also appear on these domes. Not all such structures formed during the Tauca episode. Similar structures have been found in the Ries crater in Germany, where Cladophorites species were responsible for their construction. Taxa identified at Lake Tauca include Chara species. In some places (linked to Phormidium encrustatum and Rivularia species), limited stromatolitic development took place.

Duration 

The existence of Lake Tauca was preceded by a dry period, with minor lake events recorded in Salar de Uyuni in the Late Pleistocene at 28,200–30,800 and 31,800–33,400 BP. The earlier Lake Minchin formed at the site of Lake Tauca. This period was accompanied by the disappearance of ice from Nevado Sajama. A dry period is also noted in Africa and other parts of South America around 18,000 BP, and the retreat of the Amazon rainforest may have produced the lake low-water mark. The era may have been drier than the present. Some ooid sediments formed before the Lake Tauca phase. Around 28,000 BP, lake levels rose in Lake Huinaymarca (Lake Titicaca's southern basin), preceding Lake Tauca by about two millennia. During this period, lakes in the Uyuni basin were intermittent. Previous lakes in the basin were generally small and shallow.

The radiometric age of Lake Tauca ranges from 72,600 to 7200 BP. The duration of the lake highstands may be overestimated due to radiation scatter. Radiocarbon dates have been obtained on crusts containing calcite, gastropod shells, stromatolites and structures left behind by algae. The Lake Tauca shorelines formed over more than century-long periods.

The first research, by Servant and Fontes in 1978, indicated a lake age between 12,500 and 11,000 BP according to C-14 dating. These were bracketed by dates between 12,360 ± 120 and 10,640 ± 280 BP for the highest deposits at Salar de Coipasa and Salar de Uyuni, and 10,020 ± 160 and 10,380 ± 180 BP for deposits which formed shortly before the lake dried. The reliability of the dates was questioned in 1990, and a later estimate was set at 13,000 to 10,000 BP. In 1990, Rondeau proposed ages of 14,100 to 11,000 BP based on radiocarbon dating and 7,000 to 14,800 BP based on uranium-thorium dating.

In 1993 it was suggested that Lake Tauca had an earlier phase, with water levels reaching , and a later phase reaching . Research published in 1995 indicated that the lake was shallow for over a millennium before rising to (and stabilizing at) its maximum level.

Research in 1999 indicated an earlier start of the Tauca lake cycle, which was subdivided into three phases and several sub-phases. Around 15,438 ± 80 BP (the Tauca Ia phase), water levels in Salar de Uyuni were  higher than the current salt crust. At this time, strong gully erosion and alluvial fans probably formed in Bolivian valleys. Between 13,000 and 12,000 BP, the lake reached its greatest depth——of the Tauca III period. An even-earlier start was proposed by 2001 research, based on sediments in the Uyuni basin, which determined that Lake Tauca began developing 26,100 BP. A 2001 review indicated that most radiometric dates for Lake Tauca cluster between 16,000 and 12,000 BP, with lake levels peaking around 16,000 BP. A drop in oxygen-18 concentration in the Nevado Sajama glaciers has been associated with increased precipitation around 14,300 years ago. A 2005 book estimated the duration of the Lake Tauca phase at between 15,000 and 10,500 BP.

Spillovers into neighbouring basins may have stabilized the lake levels at that point, and the level subsequently dropped over a 300-year period. The following Coipasa phase ended around 11,040 +120/-440 BP, but its chronology is uncertain.

A 2011 lake history study set the beginning of the lake-level rise at 18,500 years ago. Contradictions between lake depths determined by shorelines and diatom-fossil analysis led to two lake-level-rise chronologies: one reaching  17,000 years ago and the other reaching  between 17,500 and 15,000 years ago. The lake level would have peaked from 16,000 to 14,500 years ago at  altitude. The Coipasa phase began before 13,300 BP and reached its peak at  12,500 years ago. The Coipasa lake's regression was nearly complete around 11,500 years ago. A 2013 reconstruction envisaged a lake level rise between 18,000 - 16,500 years ago, followed by a highstand between 16,500 - 15,500 and a decrease in lake levels between 14,500 - 13,500 years ago.

Lake Tauca is sometimes subdivided into three phases (Lake Tauca proper, Ticaña and Coipasa), with the Tauca phase lasting from 19,100 to 15,600 BP. The Coipasa phase, originally thought to have lasted from 11,400 and 10,400 BP, was corrected to 9,500 to 8,500 BP and later to 12,900 - 11,800 BP; it was preceded by a 400-year long lake level rise and was followed by a 1,600 years long decline. According to a 1998 publication, Lake Tauca and the Coipasa phase lasted from 15,000 to 8,500 BP. The Coipasa phase has also been identified in Lake Chungará. The Coipasa phase was much less pronounced than the Tauca phase and shorter in duration. An earlier lake phase, Sajsi (24,000–20,000 years ago), is sometimes considered part of Lake Tauca with the Tauca and Coipasa cycles. The Sajsi lake phase preceded the Tauca phase by one or two millennia and water levels were about  lower than during the Tauca stage; it coincided with the Last Glacial Maximum.

The Ticaña phase was accompanied by a  drop in water level. The Tauca and Coipasa phases are sometimes considered separate. Lakes Tauca and Minchin have been considered the same lake system and called Lake Pocoyu, after the present-day lakes in the area. "Minchin" is also used by some authors as a name for the system.

The Chita tuff was deposited in Lake Tauca at  altitude approximately 15,650 years BP, when the lake may have been regressing. Another tuff of uncertain age was deposited above Tauca-age sediments and tufas at the southeastern Salar de Coipasa. Data from Tunupa indicate that lake levels stabilized between 17,000 and 16,000 years ago. A  lake-level drop occurred by 14,500 BP, with the lake drying between then and 13,800 years ago. Rising temperatures and a drop in precipitation were the likely triggers of lake and glacial retreat at the end of Heinrich event 1. In contrast, data from the Uyuni-Coipasa basin indicate that water levels peaked 13,000 years ago. The drying of Lake Tauca during the Ticaña lowstand has been linked to the Bølling–Allerød climate period and increased wildfires on the Altiplano; Lake Titicaca may have dropped beneath its outflow, cutting off the water supply to Lake Tauca. Glacial retreat at the beginning of the Holocene may also have been a contributing factor. As the lake receded, decreased evaporation (and cloud cover) would have enabled sunlight to increase the evaporation rate, further contributing to a decline in lake surface area.

A pattern of lake cycles becoming longer than the preceding one has been noted. Water from the lake may have contributed to increased oxygen-18 at Sajama around 14,300 years ago, possibly triggered by evaporation. As the lake level dropped, Lake Poopó would have been disconnected first; the sill separating it from the rest of Lake Tauca is relatively shallow. Coipasa and Uyuni would have remained connected until later. Water levels in Lake Titicaca's Lake Huinaimarca were low by 14,200 BP. By the Antarctic Cold Reversal, Lake Tauca was dry.

The end of the Tauca phase was followed by dry and cold conditions in the Puna, similar to the Younger Dryas, then by an early-Holocene humid period associated with decreased solar radiation. After 10,000 BP, another drought lasted from 8,500 BP to 3,600 BP, and peaked from 7,200–6,700 BP. Lake basins in the Altiplano which had filled during the Tauca phase were separated by lower lake levels. Channels between the lakes testify to their former connections.

Climate 

There are few reconstructions of how the climate looked before and after the Lake Tauca highstand. With a  temperature decrease, a 20–75% increase in precipitation would be required to form the lake. In a coupled glacier-lake model, temperatures were conditionally estimated at  lower than today. In the southern Altiplano, precipitation exceeded  during this epoch. In the central Altiplano, precipitation was 1.5 to three times higher than today. Around the lakes precipitation may have increased nine-fold.

The formation of Lake Tauca coincides with Heinrich event 1 and has been explained with a southward shift of the Bolivian high that increased transport of easterly moisture into the Altiplano and a strengthening of the South American Summer Monsoon due to a decrease in the cross-equatorial transport of heat. Earlier highstands of Altiplano lakes may also correlate to earlier Heinrich events. Increased cloud cover probably increased the effective precipitation by reducing evaporation rates. In contrast, insolation rates do not appear to be linked to lake-level highstands in the Altiplano; the lake expansion occurred when summer insolation was low although recently an insolation maximum between 26,000 and 15,000 years ago has been correlated to the Tauca stage. The humidity above the lake has been estimated at 60%, taking into account the oxygen-18 content of carbonates deposited by the lake.

Coinciding with Lake Tauca, between 17,000 and 11,000 BP glaciers expanded in the Andes between 18° and 24° south latitude. At Lake Titicaca, glacial tongues approached the shore. Such glacial advances may have been preceded by the humid episodes which formed Lake Tauca. Around 13,300 BP, maximum glacier size in southern Bolivia is associated with a highstand of Lake Tauca. Glaciers did not expand everywhere, however, and there is little evidence for glacial expansion at El Tatio, Tocorpuri and parts of the Puna. Glacier expansions at Llano de Chajantor and surroundings may or may not have occurred. Frequent incursions of polar air may have contributed to glacial expansion. At Tunupa, a volcano located in the centre of Lake Tauca, maximum glacial extent lasted until the lake reached its highest level. Glacial shrinkage beginning 14,500 years ago probably occurred at the same time as a drop in lake levels, although dating ambiguity leaves room for debate. The Cerro Azanaques moraines reached their greatest extent from 16,600 to 13,700 BP. The existence of Lake Tauca coincides with the Late Glacial Maximum, when temperatures in the central Altiplano were about  lower. Part of the glacial advance may have been nurtured by moisture from Lake Tauca, a conclusion supported by oxygen isotope data from the Sajama glaciers and by paleoclimate reconstructions around the former Lake Tauca. The Chacabaya glacial advance may be contemporaneous with Lake Tauca. Just like the Lake Tauca highstand may have coincided with the first Heinrich event, the Younger Dryas may be associated with the Coipasa highstand and the second Central Andean Pluvial Event although the Younger Dryas ended two millennia before the CAPE. The second CAPE was caused either by changes in the South American monsoon or by changes in the atmospheric circulation over the Pacific Ocean, and its end has been attributed to a warming North Atlantic drawing the ITCZ northward.

Context 
The formation and disappearance of Lake Tauca was a major hydrological event that was accompanied by several millennia of wetter climate. Its formation and the later Coipasa lake phase is associated with the Central Andean Pluvial Event (CAPE), which occurred from 18,000–14,000 to 13,800–9,700 BP. During this epoch, major environmental changes occurred in the Atacama as precipitation increased between 18° and 25° degrees south. In some areas, oases formed in the desert and human settlement began. The Central Andean Pluvial Event has been subdivided into two phases, a first one which began either 17,500 or 15,900 years ago and ended 13,800 years ago and a second phase which began 12,700 years ago and ended either 9,700 or 8,500 years ago; they were separated by a short dry period that coincides with the Ticaña lowstand. The second phase of the Central Andean Pluvial Event has been subdivided further into a wetter earlier and a drier later subphase. During the Coipasa lake cycle, precipitation may have focused on the southern Altiplano and been transported there from the Chaco; the main Tauca cycle may have been accompanied by precipitation from the northeast. A glacial advance in the Turbio valley (a feeder of the Elqui River) between 17,000 and 12,000 years ago has been attributed to the Central Andean Pluvial Event. Other indicators point to dry conditions/lack of glacier advances in central Chile and the central Puna during the highstand of Lake Tauca, glaciers had already retreated from their maximum positions by the time it began and the Central Andean Pluvial Event may not have been synchronous between the southern Altiplano and the southern and northern Atacama.

Increased precipitation during the Tauca phase was probably triggered by the southern movement of the ITCZ and the strengthening of the South America monsoon, possibly caused by chilling in the northern hemisphere and North Atlantic, along with higher water temperatures off Northeastern Brazil. Combined with a southern shift of high pressure zones, increased moisture during late glacial times would have flowed from the Amazon. This change, which occurred from 17,400–12,400 years or 18,000–11,000 BP, is recorded in Bolivian Chaco and Brazilian cave records. Some 20th century phases of higher water levels in Lake Titicaca have been correlated with episodes of increased snow cover on Northern Hemisphere continents; this may constitute an analogy to conditions during the Lake Tauca phase. The Tauca phase may have been triggered by the southern shift of tropical atmospheric circulation and a weakening of the Atlantic meridional overturning circulation that decreased northward heat transport. An intensification and southward shift of the South Atlantic Convergence Zone may have contributed to the precipitation increase but not all records agree.

Another theory posits that vegetation changes and lake development would have decreased the albedo of the Altiplano, resulting in warming and moisture advection of moisture towards the Altiplano, but such positive feedback mechanisms were considered questionable in a 1998 study. Persistent La Niña climatic conditions may have contributed to the lake's filling and also to the onset of the first CAPE. Conversely, a global climatic warming and a northward shift of the monsoon occurred around 14,500 years ago, and the northward shift of the ITCZ accompanied the Ticaña lowstand. The ideal conditions for the development of paleolakes in the Altiplano do not appear to exist during maximum glaciation or warm interglacial periods.

Related events 

During the Tauca phase, a large lake formed at Lake Titicaca; the pampas around Titicaca were left by that lake and the paleolake Minchin. Another shoreline, at  altitude, has been linked to a highstand of Lake Titicaca during the Tauca epoch. The highstand, in 13,180 ± 130 BP, is contemporaneous with the Tauca III phase. Titicaca's water level then dropped during the Ticaña phase and probably rose again during the Coipasa.

Lake Titicaca probably overflowed on the south between 26,000 and 15,000 BP, adding water to Lake Tauca. Titicaca's outflow, the Rio Desaguadero, may have been eight times that of today. Lake Titicaca was thought to have had a low water level during the Tauca phase before evidence of deeper water was found. Higher lake levels have been found at the same time in other parts of the Altiplano and areas of the Atacama above . This was not the first time Lake Titicaca rose; Pleistocene lake-level rises are known as Mataro, Cabana, Ballivian and Minchin. The overflow from Lake Titicaca into the southern Altiplano was possible for the last 50,000 years; this might explain why there is little evidence of large lakes in the southern Altiplano in the time before 50,000 years ago.

Lakes also formed (or expanded) in the Atacama at that time; highstands in Lejía Lake began rising after 11,480 ± 70 BP, and in Salar Aguas Calientes high-water levels lasted until 8,430 ± 75 BP. Highstands in Laguna Khota occurred around 12,500 and 11,000 BP. The formation of a lake at Salar de Llamara and some Salar de Atacama highstands are associated with Lake Tauca and the Coipasa highstand. Traces of the Tauca humid episode have been found at Salar Pedernales, past 26° south latitude. Lake Tauca's highstand correlates with river terraces in Peru's Pisco River; terraces dated 24,000–16,000 BP in its tributary, the Quebrada Veladera; enlarged drainage systems in the Quebrada Veladera; a humid period at Lake Junin, and new soil formation in the pampas south of the Quinto River in Argentina and in the Ahorcado river valley in Peru. During the second Central Andean Pluvial Event, soils also formed in a wetland of northern Chile.

During the Tauca phase, water levels in Laguna Miscanti were higher than today; shorelines formed from an event in Ch'iyar Quta and Lake Tuyajto; saline lakes formed in the Lipez area, and water levels rose in the Guayatayoc-Salinas Grandes basin, in Laguna de Suches in Peru and lakes at Uturuncu and Lazufre.

Downward expansion of vegetation and increased discharge in the rivers draining to the Pacific Ocean has been correlated to the Tauca period. Evidence exists at the Quebrada Mani archeological site for a higher water supply 16,400–13,700 years ago. During the Tauca, greater flow occurred in rivers in the Atacama region as well as a higher groundwater recharge; more precipitation fell in the Rio Salado valley; flooding in the Río Paraguay-Parana basin and the contribution from Andean rivers such as the Rio Salado and Rio Bermejo increased; the excavation of the Lluta River Valley, Quebrada de Purmamarca and the Colca Canyon may have been aided by an increased water supply, river incision changed, river terraces formed in the Lomas de Lachay, erosion occurred along the Pilcomayo, and an increase in Pacific plankton was probably linked to increased runoff (and an increased nutrient supply) from the Andes. groundwater-fed wetlands developed in the Cordillera de la Costa, and valleys and large salt caves formed northwest of the Salar de Atacama. 

Glaciers advanced in the Cordillera de Cochabamba. An ice cap formed over the Los Frailes ignimbrite plateau; its demise after the end of the Lake Tauca period may have allowed magma to ascend and form the Nuevo Mundo volcano. Moraine formed at Hualca Hualca and Nevado de Chañi where glaciers expanded; the Choqueyapu II glacier in the Eastern Cordillera advanced; moraines formed from glacial advances in Argentina (including the Sierra de Santa Victoria); basal sliding glaciers formed at Sajama; periglacial phenomena became more significant in northwestern Argentina from increased moisture supply; glaciers and probably also rock glaciers grew at Sillajhuay; snow cover in the Atacama Altiplano increased to about 10% above  elevation; A glacial advance in central Chile around 15,000 years ago, also associated with increased precipitation and the Lake Tauca period, was probably triggered by tropical circulation changes. 

Landslide activity decreased in northwestern Argentina but increased at Aricota, Locumba River, Peru; alluvial fans were active in the Cordillera Oriental of Peru; tufa deposition began in the Cuncaicha cave north of Coropuna; the climate grew wetter over the southern Amazon as evidenced in Brazilian cave deposits; precipitation and forest cover in Pampa del Tamarugal increased with an interruption ("Late Pleistocene Pampa del Tamarugal desiccation event") during the Ticaña lowstand; the vegetation limit in the Atacama desert descended towards the coast; groundwater discharge in the Atacama increased; wetlands developed at Salar de Punta Negra; the "Pica glass" formed in the Atacama as a consequence of increased vegetation and the occurrence of wildfires in this vegetation and plant pathogens such as rust fungi were more diverse than today. Prosopis tamarugo grew at higher altitude thanks to a better water supply; and vegetation coverage increased in the Atacama Altiplano.  The well dated record of Lake Tauca has been used to correlate climatic events elsewhere in the region.

Environmental consequences 

Paleoindian settlement in South America commenced during the Lake Tauca and Ticaña stages, facilitated by the more favourable environment during the CAPE; the Viscachani culture around Lake Titicaca was contemporaneous with Lake Tauca. The earliest human dispersal in the region around Lake Tauca occurred towards the end of the Ticaña phase, with the Coipasa phase coinciding with the definitive establishment of humans in the region and also their spread through northwestern Argentina, where conditions were favourable. In the Atacama area, Tauca-age paleolakes had provided the environment for first settlers; the end of the paleolake phase coinciding with Lake Tauca was accompanied by the end of the first phase of human settlement, which had occurred during the Central Andean Pluvial Event; now humans left the desert. Likewise in the Altiplano, the wet period that was contemporaneous to Lake Tauca allowed the settlement of Cerro Kaskio and Cueva Bautista close by, and the Central Andean Pluvial Event did the same in the Pampa del Tamarugal and the southern Atacama valleys. The initial peopling of the Salar de Atacama region was during the Lake Tauca time, but a sharp population drop took place after its drying. Inca towers on the Altiplano have been built with rocks left by Lake Tauca.

Some fossil water reserves in the dry Andes formed during the Tauca phase, the groundwater in the northern Chilean Central Valley and part of the groundwater under Pampa del Tamarugal for example date back to the Lake Tauca wet phase. Lake Tauca may have supplied water to the Rio de la Plata region, sustaining life there during dry periods.

The high aerosol content of the air in the Uyuni region has been attributed to fine sediments left by Lake Tauca. Diatomaceous deposits containing clay or calc were left behind by the lake, and ulexite deposits were formed by sediments in its deltas.

The taxonomic similarity between fish species of the genus Orestias in Lauca National Park and Salar de Carcote has been attributed to these watersheds' being part of Lake Tauca; in general the evolution of these fish was heavily influenced by the various lake cycles including these that preceded the Tauca cycle. The drying of the ancient lakes would have fragmented amphibious habitats, generating separate populations. During the Tauca and subsequent Coipasa cycles the Atacama Altiplano had far more life than today, including now-extinct deer and horses.

Altiplanos and paleolakes in Latin America

See also 

 Aucanquilcha, Coropuna, Irruputuncu, Uturunku

Notes

References

Bibliography

External links 

 The endemic gastropod fauna of Lake Titicaca: correlation between molecular evolution and hydrographic history
 Late Quaternary paleohydrology and surficial processes of the Atacama Desert, Chile: Evidence from wetland deposits and stable isotopes of soil salts
 Plausible effects of paleolake Tauca on the Altiplano circulations and rainfall from WRF model simulation

Former lakes of South America
Geology of Bolivia
Tauca
Geology of Peru
Tauca
Pleistocene South America
Late Pleistocene
Holocene